Etoka may refer to:
Taski Etoka, a leader of Chickasaw (Native American people)
Etoka, Russia, a village (selo) in Stavropol Krai, Russia
Etoka (river), a mountain creek in Stavropol Krai, Russia

See also
 Etoko (disambiguation)